The Order of Friendship is a state order awarded by the government of North Korea. It is restricted only to non-nationals. The order has two classes. 

The order was established on 25 July 1985.

Recipients

First Class

Second Class

See also

Orders, decorations, and medals of North Korea

Notes 

Society of North Korea
Friendship, Order of